Kristján Lúðvík Möller (born 26 June 1953) is an Icelandic politician. He has been Iceland's Minister of Communications from 2007 to 2010, and a member of the Althing (Iceland's parliament) from 1999 to 2016, for the Northwest Iceland constituency (1999–2003) and the Northeast Iceland constituency (2003–2016). He is the older brother of Alma Möller.

References 

Kristjan Moller
Kristjan Moller
1953 births
Living people
Kristjan Moller